Frigoribacterium salinisoli is a Gram-positive, short-rod and aerobic bacterium from the genus Frigoribacterium which has been isolated from saline soil from Lingxian in China.

References

External links
Type strain of Frigoribacterium salinisoli at BacDive -  the Bacterial Diversity Metadatabase

Microbacteriaceae
Bacteria described in 2016